Emre Bilgin (born 26 February 2004) is a Turkish professional footballer who plays as a goalkeeper for the Süper Lig Beşiktaş.

Club career
A youth product of Bayrampaşa Demirspor, Bilgin joined the youth academy of Beşiktaş in 2014. On 7 August 2020, he signed his first professional contract with Beşiktaş, keeping him at the club at least until 2023. He debuted with Beşiktaş in a 1–1 Süper Lig tie with Hatayspor on 19 March 2022.

International career
Bilgen is a youth international for Turkey, having represented the Turkey U15s, U16s, and U19s.

Honours

Club
Beşiktaş J.K.
Süper Lig: 2020–21
Türkiye Kupası: 2020–21
Süper Kupa: 2021

References

External links
 
 
 BJK Profile

2004 births
Living people
People from Güngören
Footballers from Istanbul
Turkish footballers
Turkey youth international footballers
Association football goalkeepers
Süper Lig players
Beşiktaş J.K. footballers